Pyxicephalinae is a subfamily of frogs under the family Pyxicephalidae.

Classification
Pyxicephalinae contains two genera, with a total of six species.

Subfamily Pyxicephalinae
 Genus Aubria Boulenger, 1917 - contains two species, the Masako fishing frog and the brown ball frog
 Genus Pyxicephalus Tschudi, 1838 - contains four species of African bull frogs

References

Pyxicephalidae
Amphibian subfamilies
Taxa named by Charles Lucien Bonaparte